The Zurich Open was a WTA Tour affiliated professional tennis tournament for women, formerly held every winter in Zürich, Switzerland. It was classified on the WTA Tour as a Tier I tournament from 1993 until 2007. In its final year, 2008, it was downgraded to a Tier II event.

The Open was held at the Hallenstadion, a multifunctional sports arena. It takes 150 specialist workers and 300 tonnes of material to prepare the Hallenstadion into the Zurich Open tennis venue. The event has two tennis courts available for tournament play.
 
Past champions of the tournament include former world number ones Steffi Graf, Lindsay Davenport, Martina Hingis, Venus Williams,  Justine Henin and Maria Sharapova. Swiss champions included Hingis, Manuela Maleeva-Fragnière (formerly of Bulgaria) and Patty Schnyder.

Name history
 European Indoors: 1984–1989
 BMW European Indoors: 1990–1992
 Barilla Indoors: 1993
 European Indoor Championships: 1994–1997
 European Swisscom Challenge: 1998
 Swisscom Challenge: 1999–2004
 Zurich Open: 2005–2007
 TENNIS.com Zurich Open: 2008
 BNP Paribas Zurich Open: 2012

Past finals

Singles

Doubles

Records
Most singles wins:  Steffi Graf (6)
Most consecutive single wins:  Steffi Graf (4: 1989–1992)

References

External links
Zurich Open

 
Indoor tennis tournaments
Tennis tournaments in Switzerland
Hard court tennis tournaments
WTA Tour
Recurring sporting events established in 1984
Recurring sporting events disestablished in 2008
Defunct tennis tournaments in Europe
Defunct sports competitions in Switzerland
1984 establishments in Switzerland
2008 disestablishments in Switzerland